Stade Municipal de Berkane is a football-specific stadium in Berkane, Morocco. It is the home stadium of Botola side RS Berkane. The stadium has a capacity of 10,000 since it has been all-seated.

References 

Football venues in Morocco
Sports venues completed in 2014
2014 establishments in Morocco
RS Berkane
21st-century architecture in Morocco